Harvey James Fox (born 24 September 2004) is an English professional footballer who plays as a defender for League Two club Swindon Town.

Career
Fox started his career with Swindon Town and made his first-team debut during an EFL Trophy second round tie in November 2021 against Colchester United, replacing Harry McKirdy in the 63rd minute as the Robins fell to a 2–1 defeat.

In November 2022, Fox and Town teammate Anton Dworzak joined Highworth Town on loan. Both made their debuts in the 2-0 win at Biggleswade.

Career statistics

References

External links

2004 births
Living people
English footballers
Association football defenders
Swindon Town F.C. players
English Football League players